American ginseng (Panax quinquefolius) is a herbaceous perennial plant in the ivy family, commonly used as an herb in traditional Chinese medicine. It is native to eastern North America, though it is also cultivated in China. Since the 18th century, American ginseng (P. quinquefolius) has been primarily exported to Asia, where it is highly valued for its cooling and sedative medicinal effects. It is considered to represent the cooling yin qualities, while Asian ginseng embodies the warmer aspects of yang.

Description
The aromatic root of American ginseng (Panax quinquefolius) resembles a small parsnip that forks as it matures.

American ginseng can be found in much of the eastern and central United States and in part of southeastern Canada. It is found primarily in deciduous forests of the Appalachian and Ozark regions of the United States. American ginseng is found in full shade environments in these deciduous forests underneath hardwoods.

In the United States, American ginseng is generally not listed as an endangered species, but it has been declared under threat by some states. States recognizing American ginseng as endangered include Maine and Rhode Island. States recognizing American ginseng as vulnerable are New York and Pennsylvania. States recognizing American ginseng as threatened are Michigan, New Hampshire, and Virginia. Connecticut, Massachusetts, North Carolina, and Tennessee recognize American ginseng as a special concern.

In Canada, American ginseng is listed as endangered nationally, particularly in Ontario, and as threatened in Quebec (the highest risk categories in both provinces).

Chemical components

Like Panax ginseng, American ginseng contains dammarane-type ginsenosides, or saponins, as the major biologically active constituents. Dammarane-type ginsenosides include two classifications: 20(S)-protopanaxadiol (PPD) and 20(S)-protopanaxatriol (PPT). American ginseng contains high levels of Rb1, Rd (PPD classification), and Re (PPT classification) ginsenosides—higher than that of P. ginseng in one study.

When taken orally, PPD-type ginsenosides are mostly metabolized by intestinal bacteria (anaerobes) to PPD monoglucoside, 20-O-beta-D-glucopyranosyl-20(S)-protopanaxadiol (M1). In humans, M1 is detected in plasma starting seven hours after intake of PPD-type ginsenosides and in urine starting 12 hours after intake. These findings indicate M1 is the final metabolite of PPD-type ginsenosides.

M1 is referred to in some articles as IH-901, and in others as compound-K.

Traditional medicine

The plant's root and leaves were used in traditional medicine by Native Americans. Since the 18th century, the roots were collected by "sang hunters" and sold to Chinese or Hong Kong traders, who paid high prices for particularly old wild roots.

There is no evidence that American ginseng is effective against the common cold.

Cold-fX is a product derived from the roots of North American ginseng (Panax quinquefolius). The makers of Cold-fX were criticized for making health claims about the product that have never been tested or verified scientifically. Health Canada's review of the scientific literature confirmed that this is not a claim that the manufacturer is entitled to make.

Adverse effects
Individuals requiring anticoagulant therapy such as warfarin should avoid use of ginseng. It is not recommended for individuals with impaired liver or renal function, or during pregnancy or breastfeeding. Other adverse effects include: headaches, anxiety, trouble sleeping and an upset stomach.

Recent studies have shown that through the many cultivated procedures that American ginseng is grown, fungal molds, pesticides, and various metals and residues have contaminated the crop. Though these contaminating effects are not considerably substantial, they do pose health concerns that could lead to neurological problems, intoxication, cardiovascular disease and cancer.

Production
American ginseng was formerly particularly widespread in the Appalachian and Ozark regions (and adjacent forested regions such as Pennsylvania, New York and Ontario). Due to its popularity and unique habitat requirements, the wild plant has been overharvested, as well as lost through destruction of its habitat, and is thus rare in most parts of the United States and Canada. Ginseng is also negatively affected by deer browsing, urbanization, and habitat fragmentation. It can be grown commercially, under artificial shade, woods-cultivated, or wild-simulated methods, and is usually harvested after three to four years, depending on cultivation technique; the wild-simulated method often requires up to 10 years before harvest.

Ontario, Canada, is the world's largest producer of North American ginseng. Marathon County, Wisconsin, accounts for about 95% of production in the United States. Woods-grown American ginseng programs in Vermont, Maine, Tennessee, Virginia, North Carolina, Colorado, West Virginia, and Kentucky, have been encouraging the planting of ginseng both to restore natural habitats and to remove pressure from any remaining wild ginseng.

Names
The name ginseng derives from the Chinese herbalism term, jen-shen. Other Chinese names are huaqishen or xiyangshen.

The word “panax” is derived from the Greek ‘Panakos’ ( panacea), in reference to the various benefits attributed to the herb. The word “ginseng” is said to mean “the wonder of the world”.

Conservation status
American ginseng is listed in Appendix II of the Convention on International Trade in Endangered Species to control international trade.

Gallery

References

Panax
Herbs
Medicinal plants of North America
Flora of the United States
Flora of Canada
Plants described in 1753
Taxa named by Carl Linnaeus